Tito Lupini (12 November 1955 – 23 July 2021) was a South African-born Italian rugby union player who played as a prop.

Biography
Born and raised in South Africa by Italian parents, Lupini as a player represented the provincial team of Transvaal. After the appointment of former Springboks coach Nelie Smith for Rugby Rovigo, he moved to Italy in 1985 and played for Rovigo, in whose first row constituted a key element (also being Captain of the team) for the achievement of two national titles (1988 and 1990), alongside fellow south africans Naas Botha and Gert Smal. In the 1989–90 season, won by Rovigo, Lupini had the double role of player and coach. During his time in Italy, he helped Rovigo reaching the final twice (1989 and 1992), the semifinal (1991) and a quarter final (1993). The Smith-Lupini-Botha-Smal era is still fondly remembered in Rovigo, the most rugby addicted city in Italy, for the impact it had in ending a 9 years winning drought for the team.

Lupini died from COVID-19-related complications on 23 July 2021. His mother died within 24 hours of him, also of the virus.

International career
Debuting for the Italian national team in the 1985-87 FIRA Trophy against Romania at Constanţa, Socialist Republic of Romania, Lupini was called up by the then-coach Marco Bollesan in the roster which took part in the first edition of the Rugby World Cup, playing all the three matches where Italy played.

Coaching career
After his retirement from the playing career in 1992, Lupini started his coaching career, coaching Rovigo, leading the team to the final for the national championship (then lost) against Benetton Treviso in 1992. He also coached the forwards for the Namibia national team and the same role for Rovigo.

Notes

External links

Tito Lupini international statistics

1955 births
2021 deaths
Rugby union players from Johannesburg
Italian expatriates in South Africa
Italian rugby union coaches
Italian rugby union players
Golden Lions players
Rugby Rovigo Delta players
Rugby union props
Italy international rugby union players
Deaths from the COVID-19 pandemic in South Africa
South African expatriate sportspeople in Italy
South African people of Italian descent